Kharodacetus is a genus of protocetid cetacean from the middle Eocene (late Lutetian, 42 mya) of Kutch, Gujarat, southwestern India.

Description

Kharodacetus is a large-sized protocetid with large premolars and a flat supraorbital shield with large orbits (eye sockets). Its snout is long and relatively broad, (though the snout is narrower in Gaviacetus and Makaracetus, broader in Takracetus), its orbit is high above the palate, and the premolars are large and robust. The molars have a large protocone (unlike Babiacetus) and a large metacone (unlike Maiacetus), and are, relative to P4, longer than in other protocetids.

Classification
Kharodacetus was originally described as a species of Gaviacetus, G. sahnii in 1998. It was distinguished based on the larger size of the teeth (150-200% bigger than those of Gaviacetus). However, subsequently discovered remains described in 2014 resulted in the species being allocated to its own genus.

References

Protocetidae
Fossil taxa described in 2014
Prehistoric cetacean genera
Fossils of India
Eocene mammals of Asia